Chiang Chien-ju (born 24 June 1981) is a Taiwanese rower. She competed in the women's single sculls event at the 2004 Summer Olympics.

References

1981 births
Living people
Taiwanese female rowers
Olympic rowers of Taiwan
Rowers at the 2004 Summer Olympics
Sportspeople from Taichung
Asian Games medalists in rowing
Rowers at the 2002 Asian Games
Rowers at the 2006 Asian Games
Asian Games silver medalists for Chinese Taipei
Medalists at the 2002 Asian Games
21st-century Taiwanese women